The 1984 Purdue Boilermakers football team represented Purdue University during the 1984 Big Ten Conference football season. Led by third-year head coach Leon Burtnett, the Boilermakers compiled an overall record of 7–5 with a mark of 6–3 in conference play, tying for second place in the Big Ten. Purdue was invited to the Peach Bowl, where the Boilermakers lost to Virginia. The team played home games at Ross–Ade Stadium in West Lafayette, Indiana. The Boilermakers defeated Notre Dame, Ohio State, and Michigan in the same season for the first time in program history.

Schedule

Personnel

Game summaries

vs Notre Dame

Miami (FL)

Minnesota

 Ray Wallace 32 rushes, 158 yards

Michigan State
 Jim Everett 27/42, 335 yards

Ohio State

Iowa

    
    
    
    
    
    
    
    

Iowa won in West Lafayette for the first time since 1956, snapping a 12-game losing skid at Ross–Ade Stadium.

Illinois

Northwestern

 Jim Everett 25/35, 312 yards

Michigan

Source: 
    
    
    
    
    
    
    
    
    

PUR: Steve Griffin 6 Rec, 112 yards

Wisconsin
 Jim Everett 23/49, 328 yards

Indiana

    
    
    
    
    
    
    
    
    

 A grass fire was reported in the end-zone during the game as a result of a warming barrel tipping over.
 Rodney Carter 23 rushes, 148 yards
 Steve Griffin 6 receptions, 103 yards
 Jason Houston 16 solo tackles

vs. Virginia (Peach Bowl)

References

Purdue
Purdue Boilermakers football seasons
Purdue Boilermakers football